The discography of No Use for a Name, a punk rock band active from 1987 to 2012, consists of eight studio albums, one live album, two compilation albums, four EPs, one single, and seven music videos.

Studio albums

Live albums

Compilation albums

EPs

Singles

Music videos

Other appearances 
The following No Use for a Name songs were released on compilation albums, soundtracks, and other releases.

References

Punk rock group discographies
Discographies of American artists